Evgeniya Andreevna Kosetskaya (born 16 December 1994) is a Russian badminton player. She was the women's doubles silver medalist at the 2015 Baku European Games, and settled the women's singles bronze medal in 2019 Minsk. She competed at the 2020 Tokyo Olympics.

Achievements

European Games 
Women's singles

Women's doubles

European Championships 
Women's singles

European Junior Championships 
Girls' doubles

BWF World Tour (1 runner-up) 
The BWF World Tour, which was announced on 19 March 2017 and implemented in 2018, is a series of elite badminton tournaments sanctioned by the Badminton World Federation (BWF). The BWF World Tour is divided into levels of World Tour Finals, Super 1000, Super 750, Super 500, Super 300 (part of the HSBC World Tour), and the BWF Tour Super 100.

Women's singles

BWF Grand Prix (1 title, 3 runners-up) 
The BWF Grand Prix had two levels, the Grand Prix and Grand Prix Gold. It was a series of badminton tournaments sanctioned by the Badminton World Federation (BWF) and played between 2007 and 2017.

Women's singles

Women's doubles

  BWF Grand Prix Gold tournament
  BWF Grand Prix tournament

BWF International Challenge/Series (14 titles, 6 runners-up) 
Women's singles

Women's doubles

Mixed doubles

  BWF International Challenge tournament
  BWF International Series tournament
  BWF Future Series tournament

References

External links 

 
  at www.baku2015.com

1994 births
Living people
Sportspeople from Chelyabinsk
Russian female badminton players
Badminton players at the 2020 Summer Olympics
Olympic badminton players of Russia
Badminton players at the 2015 European Games
Badminton players at the 2019 European Games
European Games silver medalists for Russia
European Games bronze medalists for Russia
European Games medalists in badminton
21st-century Russian women